Darya Romenskaya (born March 10, 1983, in Hrodna) is a female Belarusian springboard diver. Romenskaya represented Belarus at the 2008 Summer Olympics in Beijing, where she competed for the women's springboard event. She placed twenty-ninth in the preliminary rounds, with a score of 207.00 points, after six successive attempts.

References

External links
NBC 2008 Olympics profile

Belarusian female divers
Living people
Olympic divers of Belarus
Divers at the 2008 Summer Olympics
Sportspeople from Grodno
1983 births